Parkville campus may refer to:
 Monash University, Parkville campus, Victoria, Australia
Parkville Campus (University of Melbourne), Victoria, Australia